Venus Williams was the defending champion, but lost in the first round to Petra Kvitová.

Lindsay Davenport won in the final 6–2, 6–1, against Olga Govortsova.

Seeds

Draw

Finals

Top half

Bottom half

External links
Draw and Qualifying Draw

2008 WTA Tour
Singles
2008 in sports in Tennessee